Food bank For a Fed Latvia is a charity program in Latvia, which grew as one of the solutions of the Financial crisis 2007-2010 in Latvia in 2009.

Charity program "For a Fed Latvia" is held by Charitable organisation Ziedot.lv which is a charity portal that provides the possibility for individuals and companies to use the Internet to implement their desire to help those in need. Ziedot.lv offers a convenient and secure way to donate to carefully selected and approved charity projects, to follow project development and to be sure that the donation will reach its target.

Many people turn to Ziedot.lv every day, asking for support in finding a job to be able to feed their children. These are people who are affected by unemployment and Economic crisis. Their unemployment benefits expire and new job opportunities are almost nonexistent. Children are raised by families that have the difficult task of explaining to that there will be nothing for dinner that night.

Description
The charity program "For a Fed Latvia" is founded in September, 2009 and its aim is to support those who cannot afford everyday meals. The Food Bank “For a Fed Latvia” is gathering money to be able to provide monthly food packages to people in need. The cost of one food package does not exceed LVL 8.50 and includes products that will provide families with daily meals – 1 kg of grits or 1 kg of pearl barley, 1 kg of rice or 1 kg of buckwheat, 1.5 kg of oat flakes, 1 kg of grey peas, 0.5 kg of pasta, 2  g of flour, 1 L of oil, 1 can of meat or 1 can of fish, 1 kg of sugar, 0.4 kg of milk powder, 120 g of stock cubes and 30 g of tea.

Project as established in cooperation with regional Charity organisations, the Latvian Association of Samaritans, advertising agency DDB Worldwide and international relations agency Nords Porter Novelli. The project logistics expenses are covered by Soros Fondation Latvia.

Food banks are well known experience in all over the world. There have been such food banks as: Food banks Canada, Food Bank For New York City, Food Bank of Delaware and others.

See also

Food loss and waste
Food security
Poverty
 List of food banks

References

2009 establishments in Latvia
Organisations based in Latvia
Food banks